Consonance is a stylistic literary device identified by the repetition of identical or similar consonants in neighboring words whose vowel sounds are different (e.g. coming home, hot foot). Consonance may be regarded as the counterpart to the vowel-sound repetition known as assonance.

Alliteration is a special case of consonance where the repeated consonant sound is at the stressed syllable, as in "few flocked to the fight" or "around the rugged rock the ragged rascal ran".  Alliteration is usually distinguished from other types of consonance in poetic analysis, and has different uses and effects.

An example is the verse from Edgar Allan Poe's "The Raven": "And the silken sad uncertain rustling of each purple curtain." (This example also contains assonance around the "ur" sound.) Another example of consonance is the word "sibilance" itself.

Consonance is an element of half-rhyme poetic format, sometimes called "slant rhyme". It is common in hip-hop music, as for example in the song Zealots by the Fugees: "Rap rejects my tape deck, ejects projectile/Whether Jew or gentile I rank top percentile." (This is also an example of internal rhyme.)

See also
 Assonance
 Figure of speech
 Rhyming
 Rhyme scheme

References

External links
 Examples of consonance in poetry.

Poetic devices
Rhetorical techniques